LaDarius Robert Perkins (born September 18, 1990) is a former American football running back. He played college football for Mississippi State University, and signed with the Green Bay Packers as an undrafted free agent in 2014. Perkins has also been a member of the Pittsburgh Steelers, as well as the Fall Experimental Football League's Omaha Mammoths and Brooklyn Bolts, the Canadian Football League's Edmonton Eskimos, and the Alliance of American Football's Birmingham Iron.

Professional career

Green Bay Packers
After going undrafted in the 2014 NFL Draft, Perkins signed with the Green Bay Packers on May 12, 2014.

Pittsburgh Steelers
On November 19, 2014, Perkins was signed to the Pittsburgh Steelers practice squad.

Indianapolis Colts
Perkins was signed to the practice squad of the Indianapolis Colts on December 16, 2015.

Edmonton Eskimos
Perkins signed with the Edmonton Eskimos of the Canadian Football League (CFL) on September 1, 2016, half-way through the 2017 season. He saw his first action in the CFL when running backs John White, Travon Van, and Kendial Lawrence all went down with injury moving Perkins into a prominent role for the teams Week 7 match against the Hamilton Tiger-Cats, in which he carried the ball 19 times for 105 yards.

He was released on May 20, 2018.

Birmingham Iron
In 2019, Perkins joined the Birmingham Iron of the Alliance of American Football. After the first 5 games of the season, he was waived on March 12, 2019. Perkins' statistic numbered 14 carries for 42 yards and 14 receptions for 66 yards.

References

External links
 Profile at HailState.com

1990 births
Living people
African-American players of American football
African-American players of Canadian football
American football running backs
Canadian football running backs
Brooklyn Bolts players
Edmonton Elks players
Indianapolis Colts players
Mississippi State Bulldogs football players
Omaha Mammoths players
Players of American football from Mississippi
Sportspeople from Greenville, Mississippi
Green Bay Packers players
Birmingham Iron players
21st-century African-American sportspeople